Ctenomorpha marginipennis, the margin-winged stick insect, is a species of stick insect endemic to southern Australia. The species was first described by George Robert Gray in 1833.

Description

C. marginipennis resembles a eucalyptus twig and can grow up to 20 cm in length. The males are long and slender, have full wings and can fly. The females are larger with blackish hindwings. The wings of the females are smaller than those of the males. The legs and head (prothorax) are light pinkish brown, with the legs being dentated. The mesothorax, tegmina, abdomen and leaflets, are all blackish green. The mesothorax may have small tubercles. The abdomen contains numerous small spots. The cerci are extremely long and may be somewhat dentated. The nymphs are similar to the older stage, but with only small wing buds instead of the full-length wings of the adults. This species can be distinguished from other members of the family by their extremely long cerci and by the appearance of their eggs.

Distribution and habitat
This species is quite common in heaths and woodlands from southern Queensland south to Victoria, but prefers coastal environments.

Reproduction
The female lays 3 mm elliptical eggs that look like plant seeds. Like most phasmids, C. marginipennis flicks its eggs on the soil, where a little knob called the capitullum attracts ants to carry them to the ant refinery, where they hatch. This species is parthenogenetic.

Ecology
Ctenomorpha marginipennis feeds on leaves from the eucalyptus tree as well as other tree species. It is a twig mimic, its body shape and colouration making it well camouflaged among eucalyptus twigs.

See also
 Phasmatodea

References

Further reading
  Balderson, J., Rentz, D.C.F. and Roach, A.M.E. (1998). in Houston, W.K.K. & Wells, A. (1998) (eds) Zoological Catalogue of Australia. Vol. 23. Archaeognatha, Zygentoma, Blattodea, Isoptera, Mantodea, Dermaptera, Phasmatodea, Embioptera, Zoraptera. Melbourne: CSIRO Publishing, Australia. pp. 347 – 376.
 Brock, P.D. (1999). Review, Zoological Catalogue of Australia. Bulletin of the Amateur Entomological Society, 58: 177–178.
 Campbell, K. G., Hadlington, P., 1967. The biology of the three species of phasmatids which occur in plague numbers in forests of south eastern Australia. Forestry Commission NSW Res. Note No. 20, 38 pp.
 Clark, J.T. (1976). The eggs of stick insects (Phasmida): a review with descriptions of the eggs of eleven species. Syst. Ent. 1: 95–105.
 Hughes, L., 1996. When an Insect is more like a Plant. Nature Australia, 25(4): 30–38
 Gray, G.R. (1833). The Entomology of Australia in a Series of Monographs. Part 1. The monograph of the genus Phasma. London: Longman & Co. 28 pp. 8 pls
 Gray, G.R. (1834). Descriptions of several species of Australian Phasmata. Transactions of the Royal Entomological Society of London, i, 1 (7 November), pp. 45–46.
 Gray, G.R. (1835). Synopsis of the Species of Insects Belonging to the Family of Phasmidae. 48pp. (Longman, Rees, Orme, Brown, Green and Longman: London.)
 Lea, A.M. (1902). Notes on some remarkable Tasmanian invertebrates. Pap. Proc. Royal Society of Tasmania, 1902: 81–82.
 Readshaw, J. L. (1965). A theory of Phasmatid outbreak release. Australian Journal of Zoology, 13: 475–90
 Rainbow, W.J. (1897). Catalogue of the described Phasmidae of Australia. Records of the Australian Museum, 3(2), 37–44. [Note that he made a mistake re Extatosoma popa and E. tiaratum according to Gurney, A.B. (1947). Notes on some remarkable Australasian walkingsticks, including a synopsis of the Genus Extatosoma (Orthoptera: Phasmatidae). Annals of the Entomological Society of America. 40(3): 373–396. .]
 Rentz, D.C.F (1996). Grasshopper Country, Chapter 16, Phasmatodea: Leaf and Stick Insects, pp. 244–257
 Tepper, J.G.O. (1887). Description of a supposed new species of Phasmidæ. Transactions of the Royal Society of South Australia, 9 (1885–86): 112–113, pl. vi. [Published March, 1887.] 
 Tepper, J.G.O. (1902). List of the Described Genera and Species of the Australian and Polynesian Phasmidæ (Spectre-Insects). Transactions of the Royal Society of South Australia, 26: 278–287.
 Vickery, V.R. (1983). Catalogue of Australian Stick Insects (Phasmida, Phasmatodea, Phasmatoptera, Or Cheleutoptera). CSIRO Australian Division of Entomology Technical Paper, No. 20, 15 pp.

External links
Phasmid Study Group: Ctenomorpha marginipennis

Phasmatidae
Insects of Australia
Taxa named by George Robert Gray